United Nations Security Council resolution 702, adopted without a vote on 8 August 1991, after examining separately the applications of the Democratic People's Republic of Korea (North Korea) and the Republic of Korea (South Korea) for membership in the United Nations, the Council recommended to the General Assembly that North Korea and South Korea be admitted.

On 17 September 1991, the General Assembly admitted both countries under Resolution 46/1.

See also
 Member states of the United Nations
 List of United Nations Security Council Resolutions 701 to 800 (1991–1993)
List of United Nations Security Council resolutions concerning North Korea
Korea and the United Nations

References

External links
 
Text of the Resolution at undocs.org

 0702
History of North Korea
History of South Korea
Korea and the United Nations
 0702
 0702
 0702
August 1991 events
1991 in South Korea
1991 in North Korea